Totara Valley is a small rural community in the Timaru District, New Zealand. It is located north-west of Pleasant Point and east of Albury. The Ōpihi River runs through the area.

Demographics
Totara Valley is part of the Levels Valley statistical area.

References

Timaru District
Populated places in Canterbury, New Zealand